In combinatorics, the symbolic method is a technique for counting combinatorial objects.  It uses the internal structure of the objects to derive formulas for their generating functions.  The method is mostly associated with Philippe Flajolet and is detailed in Part A of his book with Robert Sedgewick, Analytic Combinatorics, while the rest of the book explains how to use complex analysis in order to get asymptotic and probabilistic results on the corresponding generating functions.

During two centuries, generating functions were popping up via the corresponding recurrences on their coefficients (as can be seen in the seminal works of Bernoulli, Euler, Arthur Cayley, Schröder, 
Ramanujan, Riordan, Knuth, etc.).
It was then slowly realized that the generating functions were capturing many other facets of the initial discrete combinatorial objects, and that this could be done in a more direct formal way: The recursive nature of some combinatorial structures 
translates, via some isomorphisms, into noteworthy identities on the corresponding generating functions. 
Following the works of Pólya, further advances were thus done in this spirit in the 1970s with generic uses of languages for specifying combinatorial classes and their generating functions, as found in works by Foata and Schützenberger on permutations, 
Bender and Goldman on prefabs, and Joyal on combinatorial species.

Note that this symbolic method in enumeration is unrelated to "Blissard's symbolic method", which is just another old name for umbral calculus.

The symbolic method in combinatorics constitutes the first step of many analyses of combinatorial structures, 
which can then lead to fast computation schemes, to asymptotic properties and limit laws, to random generation, all of them being suitable to automatization via computer algebra.

Classes of combinatorial structures 
Consider the problem of distributing objects given by a generating function into a set of n slots, where a permutation group G of degree n acts on the slots to create an equivalence relation of filled slot configurations, and asking about the generating function of the configurations by weight of the configurations with respect to this equivalence relation, where the weight of a configuration is the sum of the weights of the objects in the slots. We will first explain how to solve this problem in the labelled and the unlabelled case and use the solution to motivate the creation of classes of combinatorial structures.

The Pólya enumeration theorem solves this problem in the unlabelled case. Let f(z) be the ordinary generating function (OGF) of the objects, then the OGF of the configurations is given by the substituted cycle index

In the labelled case we use an exponential generating function (EGF) g(z) of the objects and apply the Labelled enumeration theorem, which says that the EGF of the configurations is given by

We are able to enumerate filled slot configurations using either PET in the unlabelled case or the labelled enumeration theorem in the labelled case. We now ask about the generating function of configurations obtained when there is more than one set of slots, with a permutation group acting on each. Clearly the orbits do not intersect and we may add the respective generating functions. Suppose, for example, that we want to enumerate unlabelled sequences of length two or three of some objects contained in a set X. There are two sets of slots, the first one containing two slots, and the second one, three slots. We represent this by the following formal power series in X:

Similarly, consider the labelled problem of creating cycles of arbitrary length  from a set of labelled objects X. This yields the following series of actions of cyclic groups:

Clearly we can assign meaning to any such power series of quotients (orbits) with respect to permutation groups, where we restrict the groups of degree n to the conjugacy classes  of the symmetric group , which form a unique factorization domain. (The orbits with respect to two groups from the same conjugacy class are isomorphic.) This motivates the following definition.

A class  of combinatorial structures is a formal series

where  (the "A" is for "atoms") is the set of primes of the UFD  and 

In the following we will simplify our notation a bit and write e.g.

for the classes mentioned above.

The Flajolet–Sedgewick fundamental theorem 

A theorem in the Flajolet–Sedgewick theory of symbolic combinatorics treats the enumeration problem of labelled and unlabelled combinatorial classes by means of the creation of symbolic operators that make it possible to translate equations involving combinatorial structures directly (and automatically) into equations in the generating functions of these structures.

Let  be a class of combinatorial structures. The OGF  of  where X has OGF  and the EGF  of   where X is labelled with EGF  are given by

and

In the labelled case we have the additional requirement that X not contain elements of size zero. It is possible to assign meaning to both  (the most common example is the case of unlabelled sets) and  To prove the theorem simply apply PET (Pólya enumeration theorem) and the labelled enumeration theorem.

The power of this theorem lies in the fact that it makes it possible to construct operators on generating functions that represent combinatorial classes. A structural equation between combinatorial classes thus translates directly into an equation in the corresponding generating functions. Moreover, in the labelled case it is evident from the formula that we may replace  by the atom z and compute the resulting operator, which may then be applied to EGFs. We now proceed to construct the most important operators. The reader may wish to compare with the data on the cycle index page.

The sequence operator  

This operator corresponds to the class

and represents sequences, i.e. the slots are not being permuted and there is exactly one empty sequence. We have

and

The cycle operator  

This operator corresponds to the class

i.e., cycles containing at least one object. We have

or

and

This operator, together with the set operator , and their restrictions to specific degrees are used to compute random permutation statistics. There are two useful restrictions of this operator, namely to even and odd cycles.

The labelled even cycle operator  is

which yields

This implies that the labelled odd cycle operator 

is given by

The multiset/set operator  

The series is

i.e., the symmetric group is applied to the slots. This creates multisets in the unlabelled case and sets in the labelled case (there are no multisets in the labelled case because the labels distinguish multiple instances of the same object from the set being put into different slots). We include the empty set in both the labelled and the unlabelled case.

The unlabelled case is done using the function

so that

Evaluating  we obtain

For the labelled case we have

This is because in the labeled case there are no multisets (the labels distinguish the constituents of a compound combinatorial class) whereas in the unlabeled case there are multisets and sets, with the latter being given by

Procedure
Typically, one starts with the neutral class , containing a single object of size 0 (the neutral object, often denoted by ), and one or more atomic classes , each containing a single object of size 1.  Next, set-theoretic relations involving various simple operations, such as disjoint unions, products, sets, sequences, and multisets define more complex classes in terms of the already defined classes.  These relations may be recursive.  The elegance of symbolic combinatorics lies in that the set theoretic, or symbolic, relations translate directly into algebraic relations involving the generating functions.

In this article, we will follow the convention of using script uppercase letters to denote combinatorial classes and the corresponding plain letters for the generating functions (so the class  has generating function ).

There are two types of generating functions commonly used in symbolic combinatorics—ordinary generating functions, used for combinatorial classes of unlabelled objects, and exponential generating functions, used for classes of labelled objects.

The relations corresponding to other operations depend on whether we are talking about labelled or unlabelled structures (and ordinary or exponential generating functions).

Combinatorial sum
The restriction of unions to disjoint unions is an important one; however, in the formal specification of symbolic combinatorics, it is too much trouble to keep track of which sets are disjoint. Instead, we make use of a construction that guarantees there is no intersection (be careful, however; this affects the semantics of the operation as well). The combinatorial sum is then:

This is the operation that formally corresponds to addition.

Unlabelled structures
With unlabelled structures, an ordinary generating function (OGF) is used.  The OGF of a sequence  is defined as

Product
This should be a fairly intuitive definition.

Using the definition of the OGF and some elementary algebra, we can show that

 implies

Sequence

This leads to the relation

Set

which leads to the relation

where the expansion

was used to go from line 4 to line 5.

Multiset
The multiset construction, denoted  is a generalization of the set construction.  In the set construction, each element can occur zero or one times.  In a multiset, each element can appear an arbitrary number of times.  Therefore,

This leads to the relation

Other elementary constructions
Other important elementary constructions are:
the cycle construction, like sequences except that cyclic rotations are not considered distinct

The derivations for these constructions are too complicated to show here.  Here are the results:

Examples
Many combinatorial classes can be built using these elementary constructions. For example, the class of plane trees (that is, trees embedded in the plane, so that the order of the subtrees matters) is specified by the recursive relation

In other words, a tree is a root node of size 1 and a sequence of subtrees.  This gives

we solve for G(z) by multiplying  to get

subtracting z and solving for G(z) using the quadratic formula gives

Another example (and a classic combinatorics problem) is integer partitions.  First, define the class of positive integers , where the size of each integer is its value:

Now, define the set of partitions  as

Specification and specifiable classes
The elementary constructions mentioned above allow to define the notion of specification. Those specification allow to use a set of recursive equations, with multiple combinatorial classes.

A class of combinatorial structures is said to be constructible or specifiable when it admits a specification.

Labelled structures
An object is weakly labelled if each of its atoms has a nonnegative integer label, and each of these labels is distinct.  An object is (strongly or well) labelled, if furthermore, these labels comprise the consecutive integers .  Note: some combinatorial classes are best specified as labelled structures or unlabelled structures, but some readily admit both specifications.  A good example of labelled structures is the class of labelled graphs.

With labelled structures, an exponential generating function (EGF) is used.  The EGF of a sequence  is defined as

Product
For labelled structures, we must use a different definition for product than for unlabelled structures.  In fact, if we simply used the cartesian product, the resulting structures would not even be well labelled.  Instead, we use the so-called labelled product, denoted 

We will restrict our attention to relabellings that are consistent with the order of the original labels. Note that there are still multiple ways to do the relabelling; thus, each pair of members determines not a single member in the product, but a set of new members. The details of this construction are found on the page of the Labelled enumeration theorem.

To aid this development, let us define a function, that takes as its argument a (possibly weakly) labelled object  and relabels its atoms in an order-consistent way so that  is well labelled.

Therefore, the total number of objects of size  is

This binomial convolution relation for the terms is equivalent to multiplying the EGFs,

Sequence
The sequence construction  is defined similarly to the unlabelled case:

and again, as above,

Set
In labelled structures, a set of  elements corresponds to exactly  sequences. This is different from the unlabelled case, where some of the permutations may coincide.

Cycle
Cycles are also easier than in the unlabelled case. A cycle of length  corresponds to  distinct sequences.

Boxed product
Then we have,

or equivalently,

Example
An increasing Cayley tree is a labelled non-plane and rooted tree whose labels along any branch stemming from the root form an increasing sequence. Then, let  be the class of such trees. The recursive specification is now

Other elementary constructions

The operators

and 

represent cycles of even and odd length, and sets of even and odd cardinality.

Example

Stirling numbers of the second kind may be derived and analyzed using the structural decomposition

The decomposition

is used to study unsigned Stirling numbers of the first kind, and in the derivation of the statistics of random permutations. A detailed examination of the exponential generating functions associated to Stirling numbers within symbolic combinatorics may be found on the page on Stirling numbers and exponential generating functions in symbolic combinatorics.

See also
Combinatorial species

References

 François Bergeron, Gilbert Labelle, Pierre Leroux, Théorie des espèces et combinatoire des structures arborescentes, LaCIM, Montréal (1994). English version: Combinatorial Species and Tree-like Structures, Cambridge University Press (1998).
 Philippe Flajolet and Robert Sedgewick, Analytic Combinatorics, Cambridge University Press (2009). (available online: http://algo.inria.fr/flajolet/Publications/book.pdf)
 Micha Hofri, Analysis of Algorithms: Computational Methods and Mathematical Tools, Oxford University Press (1995).

Combinatorics